Erik Lindegren (August 5, 1910 – May 31, 1968) was a Swedish author, poet, critical writer and member of the Swedish Academy (1962–68, chair 17). Grandson of composer Johan Lindegren.

Lindegren was born in Luleå, Norrbotten County, the son of a railway engineer. With Gunnar Ekelöf, he belonged to the most prominent exponents of the lyric modernism flourishing in his country, especially from the 1940s. His poetry books include the surreal "shattered sonnets" in mannen utan väg ("The Man Without a Way", title without capital M; 1942, a breakthrough work of its generation and a central work in fyrtiotalism literature), Sviter ("Suites", 1947) and Vinteroffer ("Winter Sacrifice", 1954). He translated the works of T. S. Eliot, Rainer Maria Rilke, Graham Greene, Saint-John Perse, Dylan Thomas, William Faulkner, Paul Claudel and many others into Swedish.

He took a keen interest in music, opera and the visual arts, and was an accomplished opera librettist at the Royal Swedish Opera, and also an informed and enthusiastic opera critic. Lindegren wrote the libretto for Karl-Birger Blomdahl's space opera Aniara among others. Between 1948 and 1950 he led the literary magazine Prisma, one of the most lavish and broad ever produced in Sweden, aiming to "gauge the state of the arts in the present". 

Lindegren was elected a member of the Swedish Academy in 1962. He died from pancreatic cancer in 1968.

Notes

1910 births
1968 deaths
People from Luleå Municipality
Swedish male poets
Dobloug Prize winners
20th-century Swedish poets
Swedish translators
Translators to Swedish
20th-century translators
Opera librettists
People from Luleå
Members of the Swedish Academy